The Thomas Merton Award has been awarded since 1972 by the Thomas Merton Center for Peace and Social Justice in Pittsburgh, United States. It is named after Thomas Merton and is given annually to "national and international individuals struggling for justice."

Award recipients
1972: James P. Carroll
1973: Dorothy Day
1974: Dick Gregory
1975: Joan Baez
1976: Dom Hélder Câmara
1977: Dick Hughes
1978: Bishop John Harris Burt & Bishop James Malone
1979: Helen Caldicott
1980: William Winpisinger
1981: The people of Poland
1982: Archbishop Raymond Hunthausen
1983: not awarded
1984: Bernice Johnson Reagon
1985: Henri Nouwen
1986: Allan Boesak
1987: Miguel D'Escoto
1988: Daniel Berrigan
1989: Comrades of El Salvador & Elizabeth Linder
1990: Marian Wright Edelman
1991: Howard Zinn
1992: Molly Rush
1993: Reverend Lucius Walker
1994: Richard Rohr OFM
1995: Marian Kramer
1996: Winona LaDuke
1997: Ron Chisom
1998: Studs Terkel
1999: Wendell Berry
2000: Ronald V. Dellums
2001: Sister Joan Chittister
2002: Bishop Leontine T. Kelly
2003: Voices in the Wilderness
2004: Amy Goodman and Stephen Bluestone for poetry category
2005: Reverend Roy Bourgeois
2006: Angela Davis
2007: Cindy Sheehan
2008: Malik Rahim
2009: Dennis Kucinich
2010: Noam Chomsky
2011: Vandana Shiva
2012: Martin Sheen
2013: Bill McKibben
2014: Jeremy Scahill
2015: Barbara Lee
2016: Frida Berrigan
2017: The Center for Constitutional Rights
2018: The Arch City Defenders
2019: Keeanga-Yamahtta Taylor

References

External links
The Thomas Merton Center
List of award winners 1972-2019

Peace awards
Awards established in 1972
American awards
1972 establishments in Pennsylvania
Human rights awards